Olenellus is an extinct genus of redlichiid trilobites, with species of average size (about  long). It lived during the Botomian and Toyonian stages (Olenellus-zone), in what is currently North-America, part of the palaeocontinent Laurentia.

Etymology 
Olenellus means small Olenus, after a genus belonging to the Ptychopariida, to which the type species O. thompsoni was originally assigned. The name Olenus refers to a mythological figure who was turned to stone by the gods. The names of the species have the following derivations.

 agellus comes from the Latin word for field or hamlet.
 chiefensis refers to the Chief Range, which includes the Ruin Wash section, that holds the last of the Olenellina.

 fowleri was named in honor of Ed Fowler, whose quarrying skills exposed the type locality of this species.
 getzi is called after Noah L. Getz, on whose Lancaster estate several Olenellus species were first collected.
 nevadensis refers to the state of Nevada, where this species is found.
 parvofrontatus means ‘small front’ from the Latin words parvus and frontatus, indicating the short distance between the anterior border and the glabella in this species.
 roddyi was named in honor of Dr. H. Justin Roddy (1856-1943), an internationally known naturalist, curator and professor of geology.
 romensis refers to the Rome Formation.
 terminatus is from the Latin terminus, meaning final, indicating the demise of the Olenellus lineage.

Taxonomy

Relationship within the Olenellidae 
Olenellus is the only genus currently recognised in the subfamily Olenellinae. The sister group called the Mesonacinae consists of the genera Mesonacis and Mesolenellus.

Status of the clade "Paedeumias" 
"Paedeumias" was previously regarded as a genus related to Olenellus or a subgenus being part of Olenellus. Recent analysis shows that there is a group of species formerly assigned to Olenellus (Paedeumias) nested within Olenellus (O. clarki, O. nevadensis, O. parvofrontatus, O. roddyi and O. transitans). However, this group is more closely related to the majority of the remainder of Olenellus species than to O. agellus and O. romensis. This implies that either two new monophyletic subgenera need to be erected, or Olenellus (Paedeumias) and Olenellus (Olenellus) need to be dropped as subgenera, the latter being proposed by Lieberman.

Reassigned species 

 O. alabamensis  = Fremontella halli
 O. altifrontatus = Bolbolenellus altifrontatus
 O. argentus pl. 40, fig 12, 13, 15, 16, non fig. 14  = Grandinasus argentus
 O. argentus pl. 40, fig 14, non fig. 12, 13, 15, 16 = Holmiella falx
 O. bondoni = Fallotaspis bondoni 
 O. bonnensis = Mesonacis bonnensis
 O. brevoculus = Mesonacis bonnensis
 O. broegeri = Callavia broegeri
 O. bristolensis = Bristolia bristolensis
 O. bristolensis p. 8. fig 1-11, non pl. 7, fig 1, 2, 5 = Bristolia harringtoni
 O. bufrontis = Bolbolenellus sphaerulosus
 O. callavei = Callavonia callavei
 O. cylindricus = Mesonacis cylindricus
 O. eagerensis = Mesonacis eagerensis
 O. euryparia = Bolbolenellus euryparia
 O. forresti = Redlichia forresti
 O. fremonti pl. 15, fig. 18 = Bristolia fragilis
 O. fremonti pl. 37, fig. 1, 4-5 = Bolbolenellus euryparia
 O. fremonti pl. 37, fig. 1-2 = Mesonacis fremonti
 O. georgiensis, p. 220, pl. 5, fig. 7, non fig. 6 = Mesonacis vermontanus
 O. gigas = Andalusiana cornuta
 O. gilberti = Bristolia bristolensis
 O. groenlandicus = Bolbolenellus groenlandicus
 O. halli = Fremontella halli
 O. hamoculus = Mesonacis hamoculus
 O. hermani = Bolbolenellus hermani
 O. hyperboreus = Mesolenellus hyperboreus
 O. insolens = Bristolia insolens
 O. intermedius = Fritzolenellus lapworthi or F. reticulatus
 O. kentensis = Bolbolenellus groenlandicus
 O. lapworthi = Fritzolenellus lapworthi
 O. laxocules = Elliptocephala laxocules
 O. logani = Elliptocephala logani
 O. mickwitzi = Schmidtiellus mickwitzi mickwitzi
 O. mohavensis = Bristolia mohavensis
 O. multinodus = Nephrolenellus multinodus
 O. paraocules = Elliptocephala paraocules
 O. praenuntius = Elliptocephala praenuntius
 O. reticulatus = Fritzolenellus reticulatus
 O. sequomalus = Elliptocephala sequomalus
 O. sphaerulosus = Bolbolenellus sphaerulosus
 O. svalbardensis = Mesolenellus svalbardensis
 O. terranovicus = Mesonacis bonnensis
 O. torelli = Schmidtiellus mickwitzi torelli
 O. truemani = Elliptocephala walcotti
 O. truemani = Fritzolenellus truemani
 O. truncatooculatus = Mummaspis truncatooculatus
 O. vermontanus = Mesonacis vermontanus
 O. walcottanus = Wanneria walcottana

Distribution 

O. thompsoni  is found in the middle Upper Olenellus-zone of Vermont (Franklin County, Parker Slate, Georgia).

O. agellus is present in the middle Upper Olenellus-zone of Vermont (Parker Slate, Georgia).

O. chiefensis has been collected from the final layer of the Upper Olenellus-zone of Nevada (Pioche Formation).

O. clarki is found in Upper Olenellus-zone of California (Bristol Mountain, near Cadiz, on the Santa Fé Railroad, 100 miles East of Barstow, Mohave Desert, probably Latham Shale; Latham Shale – treated as the Bristolia-zonule – Marble Mountains, ½ mile East of Cadiz, and at the Southern end of the Marble Mountains, near Chambless in the Mohave Desert portion of San Bernardino County, as well as from the Latham Shale, near Summit Springs on the West side of the Providence Mountains, San Bernardino County. In California also from the Carrara Formation, Funeral Mountains, Resting Spring Range, Eagle mountain, Grapevine Mountains, Salt Spring Hills); and in Nevada (Nevada Test Site, Desert Range).

O. crassimarginatus has been collected in the middle Upper Olenellus-zone of Vermont (Parkers Quarry, Parker Slate, Georgia); and ½ mile South of East Petersburg; 2 miles North of York and Fruitville, 3 miles North of Lancaster (all in the Kinzers Shale).

O. fowleri has been collected from the final layer of the Upper Olenellus-zone of Nevada (Pioche Formation).

O. getzi is found in Upper Olenellus-zone of Pennsylvania (2 miles North of York, and Noah Getz Farm, 1 mile North of Rohrerstown, Kinzers Shale).

O. howelli occurs in the final layer of the Upper Olenellus-zone of Nevada (Pioche Formation).

O. nevadensis has been collected in the Upper Olenellus-zone, Bristolia-zonule of California (Carrara Formation, Funeral Mountains and Grapevine Mountains); and from the Latham Shale – treated as the Bristolia-zonule – at the South end of the Marble Mountains, near Chambless in the Mohave Desert portion of San Bernardino County. It also occurs in the Bristolia-zonule, Upper Olenellus-zone of Nevada (Carrara Formation, Desert Range, Locality M-5).

O. parvifrontatus has been collected in the Olenellus-zone of the Yukon Territory, Canada (Unit 6 of the Upper Illtyd Formation, Wernecke Mountains).

O. puertoblancoensis was found in the Botonian/Toyonian Olenellus-zone of the Caborca Region, Mexico (Buelna Formation, Cerro Rajon)

O. robsonensis occurs in the ?Middle Olenellus-zone of British Columbia, Canada (?Upper Mahto Formation, drift block on the slope of the Mural Glacier below Mumm Peak, Near Mount Robson).

O. roddyi occurs in the Olenellus-zone of Pennsylvania (2 miles North of York, Fruitville; 3 miles North of Lancaster; Getz Quarry; 1 mile North of Rohrerstown; ½ mile South of East Petersburg; all in the Kinzers Shale).

O. romensis occurs in the middle Upper Olenellus-zone of Virginia (Rome Formation, Mason Creek, Salem; North-East of Roanoke, near Webster; 2 miles South-West of Blue Ridge Springs, 2 miles South of Max Meadows; Mason Creek, 1 mile east of Salem; ½ mile South-East of Indian Rock; 1 mile East of Cleveland, Alabama; 1½ miles North of Montevallo; 1½ miles West of Montevallo).

O. terminatus has been collected from the final layer of the Upper Olenellus-zone of Nevada (Pioche Formation).

O. transitans has been collected from the middle Upper Olenellus-zone of Vermont (Parker Slate, Georgia).

Description 

As with most early trilobites, Olenellus has an almost flat exoskeleton, that is only thinly calcified, and has crescent-shaped eye ridges. As part of the suborder Olenellina, Olenellus lacks dorsal sutures. Like all other members of the superfamily Olenelloide, the eye-ridges emerge from the back of the frontal lobe (L4) of the central area of the cephalon, that is called glabella. Olenellus also shares the typical character of whole family Olenellidae that the frontal (L3) and middle pair (L2) of lateral lobes of the glabella are partially merged. This creates two very typical, isolated slits. It can be distinguished from the other two genera in the family, Mesolenellus and Mesonacis, because the angle in the back rim of the cephalon is less than 15°, making the head approximately semi-circular. The genal spines are reaching back no further than the 6th thorax segment, making them 4-5 times as long as the most backward lobe of the glabella (occipital ring or L0)1. The thorax is 4-4½ times wider that the axis, measured at the 3rd segment. The base of the spine on the 15th thorax segment is almost as wide as the axis itself.

Key to the species 
This key is based on Lieberman (1999), which describes only part of the species that are recognized today.

References

External links
 photograph of Olenellus chiefensis
 photograph of Olenellus getzi
 photograph of Olenellus gilberti
 photograph of Olenellus terminatus
 photograph of Olenellus thompsoni
 photograph of Olenellus transitans

Olenellidae
Redlichiida genera
Cambrian trilobites
Index fossils
Fossils of Canada
Fossils of Mexico
Fossils of the United States
Paleozoic life of Alberta
Paleozoic life of British Columbia
Paleozoic life of Newfoundland and Labrador
Paleozoic life of Nunavut
Taxa named by Elkanah Billings
Cambrian genus extinctions